The  basketball tournament at the 1983 Southeast Asian Games took place from 29 May to 5 June 1983.  This edition of the tournament featured both men's and women's tournament.  All matches took place at the Gay World Stadium in Singapore.

Tournament format
For both the men's and the women's tournament, the competition was on a round robin format, wherein the top team at the end of the single round wins the gold medal, with the next two team will take home the silver and bronze medals, respectively.

Men's tournament

Participating nations

Results

Final standings

Women's tournament

Participating nations

Results

Final standings

References

1983
1983 Southeast Asian Games events
1983 in Asian basketball
International basketball competitions hosted by Singapore